The Detroit Project was a group of people that lobbied American automakers to build cars and SUVs that have higher fuel efficiency and use alternative fuels. The group also lobbied politicians to take action to reduce the petroleum dependence of the United States.

Founders
Lawrence Bender
Laurie David
Ari Emanuel
Arianna Huffington

See also
 A Band Apart
 Participant Productions

References

External links
 http://www.detroitproject.com
 http://ourfuture.org/issues_and_campaigns/energy_independence/index.cfm

Environmental organizations based in the United States